Mazew  is a village in the administrative district of Gmina Daszyna, within Łęczyca County, Łódź Voivodeship, in central Poland.

The village has a population of 304.

References

Mazew